Igor Aleksandrovich Netto (9 January 1930 – 30 March 1999) was a Soviet footballer, considered one of the greatest Soviet players ever. He started out playing on the left of defense but, due to his offensive mentality, dribbling and technical abilities turned into a dynamic central midfielder. His versatility and footballing intelligence allowed him to play a number of positions across defense and midfield.

Ice hockey and club career
Besides football, Netto played 22 games in the 1948–49 and 1950–51 seasons as an ice hockey forward for Spartak. He quit because of the high level of traumatize intrinsic to hockey.

During his club career he played for FC Spartak Moscow from 1949 until 1966, scoring 37 goals in 367 league games, winning five Soviet championships and three cups.

International career

He was the captain of the USSR national football team from 1952 to 1965. He led the country to the gold medal in the 1956 Summer Olympics, and victory at the first ever European Championship in 1960. He missed all but one match in the 1958 FIFA World Cup due to injury, and also played all four matches in the 1962 FIFA World Cup when the Soviet Union reached the quarterfinals. In total he collected 54 international caps and four goals.

Netto was a person of exceptional honesty, which was revealed most remarkably during the 1962 FIFA World Cup match against Uruguay. At a 1–1 score, Igor Chislenko managed to strike through the net, and the resulting goal was mistakenly counted by the referee who has not seen the ball trajectory. Hearing protests from the Uruguayan keeper, Netto confirmed with Chislenko that the ball went through the net, and convinced the referee to discount the goal. Netto's team won that match anyway.

Managerial career
After retiring in 1966 he had a long, though unsuccessful career as a coach, training AC Omonia, FC Shinnik Yaroslavl, Iran, Panionios and Neftchi Baku. Netto was awarded the Order of Lenin in 1957. The stadium of Spartak Moscow reserves team is named after him.

Personal life
Igor Netto was of Estonian and Italian descent, with his Italian lineage traced from an Italian gardener emigrated to the Governorate of Estonia in the 18th century. His father Aleksander Netto (1885–1956) was originally a carpenter from Valga, Governorate of Livonia, and mother Juuli (née Tamm) (1894–1977) from Vaimastvere, Tartu County. Aleksander left Livonia for Soviet Russia with Red Latvian Riflemen in 1918. Aleksander was a fervent Communist, who even acted as a Bolshevik Councilman in Moscow. During the 1930s and Stalin's Great Purge, the family didn't dare to speak Estonian and Igor learned only Russian. Igor's brother Lev Netto (1925–2017), who spoke Estonian and was named after Lev Trotsky, was a Soviet prisoner for 8 years in Norilsk Gulag. as was also Aleksander's brother Sergei.

He was known as goose for his hissing voice, as well as goose-like walk and head shape. On 9 January 1960 he married Olga Yakovleva, an actress. They divorced around 1987 when Netto was suffering from Alzheimer's disease.

Career statistics

International goals

Honours
Spartak Moscow
Soviet Champion (5): 1952, 1953, 1956, 1958, 1962
Soviet Cup Winner (3): 1950, 1958, 1963

Soviet Union
UEFA European Football Championship (1): 1960
Soviet Olympic team: 3 games in 1952 and 5 games in 1956, with 1 goal and gold medal in 1956.
National team: 54 caps, 4 goals; participant and quarter finalist in the 1958 and 1962 playing totally in 6 matches

Individual
 UEFA European Championship Team of the Tournament: 1960

References

1930 births
1999 deaths
Footballers from Moscow
Russian people of Estonian descent
Russian people of Italian descent
Russian footballers
Soviet footballers
Olympic gold medalists for the Soviet Union
Olympic footballers of the Soviet Union
Footballers at the 1952 Summer Olympics
Footballers at the 1956 Summer Olympics
1958 FIFA World Cup players
1960 European Nations' Cup players
1962 FIFA World Cup players
UEFA European Championship-winning players
UEFA European Championship-winning captains
Soviet Top League players
FC Spartak Moscow players
Spartak athletes
Expatriate football managers in Greece
Soviet expatriate sportspeople in Greece
AC Omonia managers
Expatriate football managers in Cyprus
Soviet expatriate sportspeople in Cyprus
Soviet Union international footballers
Soviet football managers
Soviet expatriate football managers
Expatriate football managers in Iran
Iran national football team managers
Neftçi PFK managers
FC Shinnik Yaroslavl managers
Olympic medalists in football
Medalists at the 1956 Summer Olympics
Association football midfielders